Parrhasius polibetes is a butterfly of the family Lycaenidae. It was described by Caspar Stoll in 1781. It is found from Mexico to Brazil and Suriname.

References

Eumaeini
Butterflies of Central America
Lycaenidae of South America
Butterflies of North America
Taxa named by Caspar Stoll
Butterflies described in 1781